The Summer Breeze Festival is an annual music festival held in Liddington, near Swindon, in the United Kingdom. It was first held in 2007 where the audience consisted of around 150 people, in 2012 around 2,000 people attended. The festival supports up-and-coming bands and local music along with established acts and high quality headliners. The festival is run on a voluntary basis by local music enthusiasts with a passion for live music. Profits made, include those from the food and drink, are either donated to charity or invested back into the festival.

Lineup history

2012
13–15 July 2012

 360
 A & T
 Atari Pilot
 Backbeat Sound System
 Breeze
 Charlie Bath
 Corky
 Dakhal
 De Fuego
 
 Dirty Goods
 Ed Tudorpole
 Elliot Mason
 Films of Colour
 Flipron
 Fry's Cream
 Gaz Brookfield
 Grubby Jack
 Hip Route
 Jake Morley
 Jazz Morley
 Jo Selbourne
 Juan Zelada
 KT Tunstall
 Kova Me Bad
 Little and Large
 Lloyd Yates
 Luke Concannon
 Majestic
 Marcus Bonfanti
 Ode & The Bebops
 Paul Childs Band
 Ruby and the RibCage
 Sam Green
 Samsara
 Subdued
 The 1930s
 The Blue Trees
 The Congo Faith Healers
 The Costellos
 The Destroyers
 The Lazy Maybees
 The Penny Red
 The Peoples String Foundation
 The Running Club
 Tom Staniford
 Uncle Frank
 Vintage Trouble
 Wille and the Bandits

References

External links
 Official Website

Music festivals in Wiltshire
Swindon
Annual events in England
2007 establishments in England
Music festivals established in 2007